Kingsley Smith (born 15 September 1969) is a New Zealand cricketer. He played in one List A and three first-class matches for Northern Districts in 1993/94.

See also
 List of Northern Districts representative cricketers

References

External links
 

1969 births
Living people
New Zealand cricketers
Northern Districts cricketers
Sportspeople from Rotorua